The Hunt for Red October is a 1984 novel by Tom Clancy.

The Hunt for Red October may also refer to:

 The Hunt for Red October (film), a 1990 thriller film based on the novel

Video games
 The Hunt for Red October (1987 video game), based on the book
 The Hunt for Red October (1990 video game), based on the movie
 The Hunt for Red October (console game) (1991), based on the movie

See also
 Red October (disambiguation)